Caity Weaver is an American journalist, humorist, and writer at The New York Times. Previously she wrote for GQ magazine and Gawker, and contributed to Mental Floss.

Career 
In 2011, Weaver joined Gawker. With her irreverent write-ups on celebrity news and restaurant reviews, she became one of the site's most popular writers. She won critical acclaim for writing a 6,000-word feature, "My 14-Hour Search for the End of TGI Friday's Endless Appetizers", about a 14-hour all-you-can-eat T.G.I. Friday's mozzarella sticks binge. In January 2015, she was promoted to senior editor at Gawker.

In October 2015, Weaver joined the staff of GQ, writing about arts and entertainment for the publication. Her feature article about Kim Kardashian in 2016 brought GQ its "two biggest days of online traffic in the publication’s history — a million unique views when the story went live on June 16 and more than two million views over 36 hours."

In 2016, Brooklyn Magazine named Weaver one of Brooklyn's "50 Funniest People".

Weaver joined the Styles desk at the New York Times in March 2018.

References

External links
 https://www.caity.info/

American women journalists
The New York Times writers
Living people
American humorists
Date of birth missing (living people)
Journalists from Pennsylvania
American magazine journalists
21st-century American journalists
Journalists from New York City
Women humorists
Year of birth missing (living people)
21st-century American women